The 1962 Maryland Terrapins football team represented the University of Maryland in the 1962 NCAA University Division football season. In their fourth season under head coach Tom Nugent, the Terrapins compiled a 6–4 record (5–2 in conference), finished in third place in the Atlantic Coast Conference, and outscored their opponents 170 to 128. The team's statistical leaders included Dick Shiner with 1,324 passing yards, Len Chiaverini with 602 rushing yards, and Tom Brown with 557 receiving yards.

Schedule

References

Maryland
Maryland Terrapins football seasons
Maryland Terrapins football